Miss Grand International 2016 was the 4th Miss Grand International pageant, held at the Westgate International Theater in Las Vegas, Nevada, United States on 25 October 2016. 
being the first occasion in the history of the contest that this moves to the American continent, and candidates from 74 countries and autonomous territories around the world competed for the title. At the end of the event Claire Elizabeth Parker, Miss Grand International 2015 of Australia crowned Ariska Putri Pertiwi of Indonesia as Miss Grand International 2016. It is Indonesian's first victory of the country in the pageant's history.

Background

At Miss Grand International 2016, contestants from each country are scheduled to arrive at McCarran International Airport in Las Vegas, Nevada. between 8–9 October 2016. The contest organized a shuttle service from the airport to the hotel, Westgate. Las Vegas Resort and Casino Las Vegas by the contestant registration process. Including a sash handing event for representatives of each country has been held in this hotel as well. Then, on 10 October 2016, a press conference for the contest was held at City Hall in Las Vegas, Nevada. Each entrant will have the opportunity to introduce themselves and give a brief statement about the contest or other issues in front of all press conference participants.

After that, on 11–13 October 2016, all contestants visited other attractions and landmarks within the city and nearby areas such as Grand Canyon, Red Rock Canyon National Conservation Area and Hoover Dam Then on 14 October 2016, the Swimsuit Competition was held at the hotel's swimming pool. The winners of this best swimwear contest were announced in the final round. and the next day All of the contestants attended the William Carr's Photography charity red carpet fashion event to raise funds for Veterans in the United States.

On 16 October 2016, the Best National Costume Contest was held at the Fremont Street Experience in downtown Las Vegas. The contestant who receives the most votes from Facebook users around the world will receive the best national costume award. The winner was announced in the final contest on 25 October 2016.

Results

Placements

§ – Voted into the Top 10 via Miss Grand Popular Vote

Special awards

Best National Costume 
Best national costume contest was held on 16 October 2016.

Order of Announcements

Top 20

Top 10

 

 
Top 5

Contestants
74 contestants competed for the title.

Reference

External links 

 Miss Grand International official website
Miss Grand International
October 2016 events in the United States
Grand International